Mab, Mabs or MAB may refer to:

Businesses
 MAB Corporation, an Australian property company
 MAB Paints, an American company 1899–2007
 Malaysia Airlines (Malaysia Airlines Berhad, MAB)
 Malicet et Blin (M.A.B.), French bicycle and automobile manufacturer 1890–1925
 Manufacture d'armes de Bayonne, a French pistol manufacturer
 Mercado Alternativo Bursátil, Spain's alternative stock market
 Mabuhay Gardens, or The Mab, a nightclub in San Francisco, U.S.

Organisations
 Metropolitan Asylums Board, London, dealing with the poor until 1930 
 Metric Advisory Board, for metrication in New Zealand
 Movimento dos Atingidos por Barragens, a Brazilian political organization
 Muslim Association of Britain, a British Sunni Muslim organisation
 Medical Affairs Bureau, Taiwan

People
 Pattie Fotheringhame (c. 1864–1955), Australian journalist under the byline "Mab"
 Mab Copland Lineman (1892–1957), American attorney
 Mab Segrest (born 1949), American writer
 James Mabbe or Mab (1572–1642), English poet
 Michael Angelo Batio (born 1956), American guitarist
 Mabel Besant-Scott or "Mabs" (1870–1952), English theosophist

Science and technology
 Mab (moon), of Uranus
 Monoclonal antibody (mAb), an antibody made by cloning a unique white blood cell
 mAbs (journal), on antibody research
 , a metadata exchange format for libraries
 Multi-armed bandit, a problem in probability theory
 Man and the Biosphere Programme, launched in 1971 by UNESCO

Other uses
 Queen Mab, a fairy in English literature
 Multi-author blog
 Yutanduchi Mixteco language, ISO 639-3 code mab

See also

 Mabb., standard author abbreviation for botanist David Mabberley
 Henry Mabb (1872–1961), British-born Canadian politician
 Mab Darogan, a messianic figure of Welsh legend